Manuel Cardoso may refer to:
 Manuel Cardoso (composer)
 Manuel Cardoso (cyclist)
 Manuel Cardoso (gymnast)

See also
 Manuel Cardoso de Saldanha, Portuguese architect and military engineer